Julia Konrad Viezzer (born 6 August 1990) is a Brazilian actress, singer, and women's rights activist. She is known for her leading role as Gabriela, in Carlos Saldanha's fantasy Netflix series Invisible City, and her role as Pepita in International Emmy Award nominated series One Against All.

Biography and career 
Born in Recife, Pernambuco, she moved as a child to Buenos Aires, Argentina, with her family, where they lived for ten years. After graduating high school, Julia moved to New York to study performing arts, where she lived for three years, majoring in musical theatre at the American Musical and Dramatic Academy in 2012, where she was classmate of actors Madeline Brewer and Jeremy Pope. During her stay in the United States, she participated in the independent feature film Allure (2014), by award-winning Serbian director Vladan Nikolic, as the determined Marta. Premiering at the Black Nights Film Festival 2014 in Tallinn, Estonia, the film was nominated for "Best North American Film".

Her first role in Brazilian television was as singer-songwriter Janaína, in the Globo soap opera Now Generation. After a couple of guest roles in other soaps on the same network, Julia was cast as Ciça, the protagonist in the twenty-third season of the teen soap Malhação (Young Hearts).

In 2019 she plays the medium Ruth-Céline Japhet in the film Kardec, directed by Wagner de Assis. Soon after, she joins the cast of O Sétimo Guardião, on Rede Globo, where she played Raimunda.

In 2020 Julia returns as Pepita for the fourth and final season of One Against All, and releases her first single, "Vuelve", as part of the soundtrack of the series. In August, she releases her second single, "Colores", a collaboration with Pernambuco musician Barro.

Also in 2020, Julia publicly spoke for the first time about being a survivor of sexual abuse, shedding light on marital rape in Brazil and starting a movement that gives voice to survivors. After her story was published in a leading women's publication in Brazil, Claudia magazine, other actresses came forward with their own stories of abuse, and the publication set up a permanent channel so that women everywhere could share their own experiences and get the legal and psychological support needed.

In 2021, she stars in the first season of Netflix's Brazilian series, Invisible City, as anthropologist Gabriela Alves, and is cast as Paloma, an Interpol agent working undercover in Amazon Prime Video Brazilian original series Dom.

Filmography

References

External links
 

1990 births
Living people
21st-century Brazilian actresses
Actresses from Recife
People from Recife